The Marquesas Islands (or  or ; Marquesan:  (North Marquesan) and  (South Marquesan), both meaning "the land of men") are a group of volcanic islands in French Polynesia, an overseas collectivity of France in the southern Pacific Ocean. Their highest point is the peak of Mount Oave on Ua Pou island, at 1,230 m (4,035 ft) above sea level.

Archaeological research suggests the islands were colonized in the 10th century AD by voyagers from West Polynesia. Over the centuries that followed, the islands have maintained a "remarkably uniform culture, biology and language". The Marquesas were named after the 16th century Spanish Viceroy of Peru, the Marquis of Cañete by navigator , who visited them in 1595.

The Marquesas Islands constitute one of the five administrative divisions of French Polynesia. The capital of the Marquesas Islands' administrative subdivision is the town of Taiohae, on the island of Nuku Hiva. The population of the Marquesas Islands was 9,346 inhabitants at the time of the August 2017 census.

Geography

The Marquesas Islands group is one of the most remote in the world. It lies about 852 mi (1,370 km) northeast of Tahiti and about 3,000 mi (4,800 km) west of Mexico (the nearest continental land mass). It is thought to have been formed by a centre of upwelling magma, called the Marquesas hotspot. The islands in the group fall naturally into two geographical divisions. One is the northern group, consisting of Eiao, Hatutu (Hatutaa), Motu One, and the islands surrounding the large island of Nuku Hiva: Motu Iti, also called Hatu Iti; Ua Pou; Motu Oa; and Ua Huka). The other is the southern group, consisting of Fatu Uku, Tahuata, Moho Tani (Motane), Terihi, Fatu Hiva, and Motu Nao (also called Thomasset Rock), which are clustered around the main island of Hiva Oa.

The Marquesas are among the largest island groups in French Polynesia. One of the islands in the group, Nuku Hiva, is the second-largest island in the entire territory (after Tahiti). With the exception of Motu One, all the islands of the Marquesas are of volcanic origin.

Although Polynesia tends to be associated with images of lush tropical vegetation, and the Marquesas lie within the tropics, they are remarkably dry. That is because they constitute the first major break for the prevailing easterly winds that arise from the (atmospherically) dry Humboldt Current. This subjects the Marquesas to frequent drought conditions. Only those islands that reach highest into the clouds (generally, higher than 750 m / 2,500  ft above sea level) reliably have periods of precipitation. These conditions have historically led to periodic fluctuations in the availability of fresh water.  Periodic lack of water has made human habitation only intermittently sustainable in certain parts of the various islands throughout the archipelago. For example, Ua Huka Island (maximum elevation ) has a history of low population levels, and Eiao Island (maximum elevation ) has been intermittently uninhabited.

Islands of the Marquesas

Northern Marquesas

 Eiao
 Hatutu
 Motu Iti
 Motu Oa
 Motu One
 Nuku Hiva
 Ua Huka
 Ua Pou

Southern Marquesas
 Fatu Hiva
 Fatu Huku
 Hiva Oa
 Moho Tani
 Motu Nao
 Tahuata
 Terihi

Seamounts
There are also a number of seamounts or shoals, located primarily in the area of the northern Marquesas. Among these are:
 Clark Bank
 Hinakura Bank
 Lawson Bank
 Bank Jean Goguel

Geology

Most of the Marquesas Islands are of volcanic origin, created by the Marquesas hotspot that underlies the Pacific Plate. The Marquesas Islands lie above a submarine volcanic plateau of the same name. The plateau, like the islands, is generally believed to be less than 5 million years old, though one hypothesis is that the plateau (not the islands) is significantly older, and has been formed by forces similar to those that have formed the Inca Plateau, which is subducting under northern Peru.

The Marquesas islands are estimated to range in age from 1.3 million years old (Fatu Hiva) to 6 million years old (Eiao). All of them except Motu One are high islands. Motu One is a low island, consisting of a small sand bank on a coral reef, the only atoll in the Marquesas Islands. Unlike most French Polynesian islands, the Marquesas islands (other than Motu One) are not surrounded by protective fringing reefs. In those islands, coral is found only in bays and other protected areas, or, in the case of Fatu Huku, in an unusual place: in fossilized form at the top of the island. The South Equatorial Current lashes all these islands fiercely; its force has carved sea-caves that dot their shores. Although the islands have valleys that empty into small bays, they are remarkable for their mountain ridges, which end abruptly in cliffs at the edge of the sea.

Climate

Temperatures in the Marquesas are stable all year round. Precipitation is highly variable: greater in the northern and eastern (windward) coastal areas and mountains, averaging   annually; much lower in the western (leeward) areas. Average annual precipitation in the "desert" region of Nuku Hiva is only . Droughts are frequent, sometimes lasting several years, and seem to be associated with the  phenomenon.

History

The first recorded settlers of the Marquesas were Polynesians who arrived from West Polynesia. Early attempts to carbon-date evidence from the site suggested they arrived before 100 AD, with other estimates proposing settlement from 600 AD, but several more recent independent studies suggest that they arrived more recently.

For example, a 2010 study that applied higher-precision radiocarbon dating methods to more reliable samples suggests that the earliest colonisation of eastern Polynesia took place much later, within a shorter time period, and in two waves: The first was a migration into the Society Islands between about 1025 and 1120 AD (four centuries later than had previously been thought); the second, between 70 and 265 years later, was a dispersal of migrants to all the remaining Marquesas islands between about 1190 and 1290 AD. This relatively rapid colonisation is believed to account for the "remarkable uniformity of East Polynesian culture, biology and language".

A different study, published in 2014, suggested that the date of first settlement in the Marquesas was somewhat earlier: between around 900 and 1000 AD.

Historical culture

The richness of the natural resources in the islands has historically supported a large population. The inhabitants historically made a living by fishing, collecting shellfish, hunting birds, and gardening. They relied heavily on breadfruit but raised at least 32 other introduced crops. Hard evidence of significant pre-European interarchipelago trade has been found in basalt from the Marquesan quarry island of Eiao. It is known to have been distributed via sailing canoes over distances of more than 2500 km to provide adze heads to Mo'orea (Society Islands), Mangareva (Gambier Islands), Tubuai (Austral Islands), Rarotonga (Cook Islands), and Tabuaeran (Northern Line Islands).

European contact

The first Europeans to reach the Marquesas may have been the crew members aboard the San Lesmes, a Spanish vessel that disappeared in a storm in June 1526; it was part of an expedition headed by García Jofre de Loaísa. The Spanish explorer  reached them nearly 70 years later, on 21 July 1595. Mendaña visited first Fatu Hiva and then Tahuata before continuing on to the Solomon Islands.

In the late 18th century, European explorers estimated that the population was 80,000 to 100,000. Europeans and Americans were impressed with how easy life appeared to be in the islands, which had a rich habitat and environment. In 1791, the American maritime fur trader Joseph Ingraham first visited the northern Marquesas while commanding the brig . He named them the Washington Islands. In 1813, Commodore David Porter claimed Nuku Hiva for the United States, but the United States Congress never ratified that claim. For a brief period the islands exported sandalwood, however the resource was depleted within four years. 

The islands were a popular port of call for whaling ships in the Age of Sail. The first on record to visit was the Hope, in April 1791. The last known such visitor was the American whaler Alaska in February 1907.

In 1842, France conducted a successful military operation in support of the native chief Iotete's claim that he was king of the whole island of Tahuata. The French government then laid claim to the whole island group and established a settlement on Nuku Hiva. That settlement was abandoned in 1857, but France re-established control over the group in 1870. It later incorporated the Marquesas into French Polynesia.

The indigenous people of the Marquesas suffered high death rates from diseases carried by Western explorers, such as smallpox and measles, because none of them had any immunity to them.

The Marquesas lost more people to death from these diseases than any other island group in Polynesia. The population shrank from over 78,000 inhabitants in the 18th century to about 20,000 by the middle of the 19th century, and to just over 4,000 by the beginning of the 20th century, reaching an all-time low of 2,255 in 1926. After that, the population started to increase, reaching 8,548 by the time of the November 2002 census (not including the Marquesan community residing in Tahiti), and 9,346 by the time of the August 2017 census.

Government and politics
The Marquesas Islands form one of the five administrative divisions of French Polynesia. French and Tahitian are the official languages of government. The capital of the Marquesas Islands administrative subdivision is the settlement of Taiohae on the island of Nuku Hiva.

With 183,645 inhabitants (2012 census), Tahiti is the most populous island of French Polynesia, containing 68.5% of the total population of the grouping.

Residents of the Marquesas have chafed at Tahiti's overwhelming dominance, complaining of neglect by politicians based in Tahiti, and leaders have suggested developing a direct relationship with the metropole, the government in Paris, instead of depending on Papeete. As sentiment was rising in Tahiti in the 21st century for independence from France, several prominent Marquesan political leaders in 2007 floated the idea of the Marquesas Islands separating from French Polynesia but remaining within the French Republic. This has generated controversy in Tahiti, where pro-independence Tahitian leaders have accused the French central government of encouraging the separation of the Marquesas Islands from French Polynesia.

Administration

Community of communes of the Marquesas Islands (CODIM)
The Marquesas Islands do not have a provincial or regional assembly, but since 2010 the six communes (municipalities) into which the Marquesas Islands are divided have gathered to form an intercommunality, the community of communes of the Marquesas Islands (in French: communauté de communes des îles Marquises, or CODIM). As all communities of communes in France, the CODIM is not a full-fledged territorial collectivity, but only a federation of communes (in French Polynesia, only the overseas collectivity of French Polynesia and the 48 communes are territorial collectivities). The CODIM is governed by a president and by a community council (conseil communautaire) which is made up of 15 delegates elected by the municipal councils of the six communes among their members, with each commune having a number of delegates proportional to the size of its population. The president of the CODIM and the community council have their offices in Atuona, on the island of Hiva Oa. The current president is Benoît Kautai, mayor of Nuku Hiva, who was elected president by the community council in July 2020 after the 2020 French municipal elections and is due to serve for six years until the next municipal elections.

The community of communes of the Marquesas Islands was created in 2010 with the aim of delegating powers both from the six communes and from the overseas collectivity of French Polynesia to this new intercommunal structure, due to the isolation of the Marquesas Islands and distance from the seat of the French Polynesian government in Tahiti. The government of French Polynesia transferred to the CODIM the power to oversee economic development. As a result, the CODIM is now in charge of drafting a blueprint for local economic development. The French Polynesian government also transferred to the CODIM the power to grant subsidies in favor of cultural and sports activities. Transfers of powers from the six communes to the CODIM have been extremely limited. Besides drafting a blueprint for economic development and granting subsidies for cultural and sports activities, the CODIM is currently in charge only of creating hiking trails, drafting studies for waste collection (but not actually managing waste collection, which the communes kept for themselves), drafting a blueprint for transports between the islands of the archipelago, acquiring computers and office equipment for the six communes of the archipelago, and offering legal and technical support to the six communes.

The French Polynesian public auditor (chambre territoriale des comptes) has pointed out that the actions of the CODIM have been very limited and fallen short of its theoretical powers due to a very small budget (less than 100 million Pacific Francs, i.e. less than US$1 million). For example, the CODIM has not exercised its power to acquire computers and office equipment for the six communes of the archipelago, and more generally its creation has not led to a pooling of resources and expenses by the six communes. Most of the CODIM's budget has been spent on drafting a blueprint for local economic development, but the CODIM has neither the power nor the financial means to implement the blueprint and build the required infrastructure. The public auditor has called for an expansion of the powers and financial resources of the CODIM.

Deconcentrated administrations
Administratively, the Marquesas Islands form a deconcentrated subdivision of both the French central State and the government of French Polynesia. As a deconcentrated subdivision of the French central State, the Marquesas Islands form the administrative subdivision of the Marquesas, one of French Polynesia's five administrative subdivisions. The  is a civil servant under the authority of the High Commissioner of the French Republic in French Polynesia in Papeete. The  and his staff sit in Taiohae, on the island of Nuku Hiva, which has become the administrative capital of the Marquesas Islands, having replaced Atuona on the island of Hiva Oa, which was previously the capital (although, in reverse to this general trend, Atuona was selected as the seat of the community of communes of the Marquesas Islands in 2010).

 Offering legal advice to the communes (municipalities) of the Marquesas and verifying the legality of decisions made by the communes
 Issuing official documents (ID cards, driving licences, etc.), applying immigration rules, organising elections
 Managing security (coordination of gendarmerie forces, handling of major crises such as natural disasters, etc.)
 Overseeing public services of the French central State in the Marquesas Islands (such as the correctional facility on Nuku Hiva)

The  is the direct representative of the president of French Polynesia's government who appoints him. The  and his staff sit in Taiohae on Nuku Hiva, same as the State administrator.

The  is in charge of:
 Coordinating the work of French Polynesian administrations in the Marquesas Islands (such as the French Polynesian administrations in charge of roads, fisheries, etc.)
 Ensuring the enforcement of acts passed by the Assembly of French Polynesia and decisions taken by the government of French Polynesia
 Evaluating the performance of French Polynesian civil servants and sending the evaluations to the responsible ministries in Papeete
 Acting as a liaison between the local population and the government of French Polynesia in Papeete

The Marquesas Islands also form the electoral district of the Marquesas Islands, one of French Polynesia's six electoral districts for the Assembly of French Polynesia (see also Politics of French Polynesia).

Communes
The Marquesas Islands are subdivided in six communes (municipalities). In each of the six communes the local residents with either a French or another EU citizenship elect a municipal council and a mayor in charge of managing local affairs within the commune. Three communes (Nuku-Hiva, Ua-Pou, and Hiva-Oa) are further subdivided into associated communes due to their larger population. The communes and associated communes are the only elected councils in the Marquesas since there does not exist a provincial or regional assembly for the entire archipelago (the community council of the CODIM (community of communes of the Marquesas Islands) is not directly elected by local residents, but is only made up of delegates chosen by the municipal councils of the six communes). Municipal elections are held every six years on the same day as municipal elections in the rest of France (see 2020 French municipal elections for the last municipal elections). Each municipal council then selects delegates among its members to sit in the community council of the CODIM in Atuona (on the island of Hiva Oa).

The areas and populations of the communes at the 2012 Census were as follows:

 Nuku-Hiva (388 km2) 2,966
 Ua-Pou (106 km2) 2,173
 Ua-Huka (83 km2) 621
 Hiva-Oa (327 km2) 2,190
 Tahuata (61 km2) 703
 Fatu-Hiva (85 km2) 611
 Totals (1,049 km2) 9,264

Demographics

Historical population

Migrations
The places of birth of the 9,346 residents of the Marquesas Islands at the 2017 census were the following:
63.2% were born in the Marquesas Islands (down from 70.5% at the 2007 census)
29.2% in Tahiti (up from 20.9% at the 2007 census)
4.0% in Metropolitan France (down from 4.5% at the 2007 census)
2.5% in French Polynesia (other than the Marquesas Islands and Tahiti) (down from 3.0% at the 2007 census)
0.8% in foreign countries (up from 0.6% at the 2007 census)
0.3% in overseas France (other than French Polynesia) (down from 0.5% at the 2007 census)

Between the 2007 and 2017 censuses, the population of residents of the Marquesas Islands born in Tahiti rose by 50.5% (from 1,810 at the 2007 census to 2,726 at the 2017), and as a result, they made up 29.2% of the population in 2017. A lot of these arrivals from Tahiti, however, are children of Marquesans who had migrated to Tahiti and given birth there, and whose children are returning to the Marquesas, as can be seen in the language statistics: 50.8% of the Marquesas Islands' residents whose age was 15 or older and who were born in Tahiti and lived in the Marquesas at the 2017 census reported that the language they spoke the most at home was Marquesan, whereas 42.1% reported French, and only 6.6% reported Tahitian.

3,353 people born in the Marquesas Islands lived on the island of Tahiti at the 2017 census (down from 3,493 at the 2007 census), whereas 5,907 people born in the Marquesas Islands lived in the Marquesas (down from 6,106 at the 2007 census), and 705 lived in the rest of French Polynesia (up from 679 at the 2007 census). The total number of people born in the Marquesas Islands and living in French Polynesia decreased from 10,278 at the 2007 census to 9,965 at the 2017 census, as net births were not able to offset the departures to New Caledonia and Metropolitan France due to the economic crisis experienced by French Polynesia.

Religion 
Most of the population of the Marquesas Islands is Christian as a consequence of the missionary activity of the Catholic Church, and various Protestant Christian groups. The main church in the area is the Cathedral of Our Lady of Taiohae (Cathédrale Notre-Dame de Taiohae) seat of the Catholic Diocese of Taiohae (Dioecesis Taiohaënus seu Humanae Telluris).

According to 2017 data 90.1% of the population of the Marquesas Islands is affiliated with the Catholic Church an increase from 1950 when 87.3% of Catholics were recorded on the islands.

Although the Mendaña ships had chaplains on board, there does not appear to have been any serious attempt at missionary work in the Marquesas Islands. The first missionaries to arrive in the Marquesas from 1797, coming from England via Tahiti, were William Pascoe Crook (1775-1846) and John Harris (1754-1819) of the London Missionary Society. Harris could not endure the conditions at all and returned to Tahiti only a few months later. A contemporary report says that he was picked up on the beach, utterly desperate, naked and looted. Crook remained until 1799.

The American mission from Hawaii was no more successful. William Patterson Alexander (1805-1864), Benjamin Parker (1803-1877), and Richard Armstrong (1805-1860) arrived in the Marquesas in 1834 from Hawaii with their wives and a three-month-old baby. They returned the same year. In 1853, more missionaries led by James Kekela (1824-1904) arrived at Fatu Hiva with their wives from Hawaii, but were unable to remain there because of clashes with Catholic missionaries arriving on a French warship.

Protestants went to Hiva Oa, and also had little success. There were few converts; tribal warfare and human sacrifice continued. Protestant missionaries gradually left Hiva Oa and returned to Hawaii, and only James Kekela remained. In 1899, he returned to Hawaii, dying in Honolulu on 29 November 1904. Hawaiian-born missionary James Bicknell translated the Gospel of John into the Marquesan language in 1857.

From 1838 to 1839, the Catholic mission was able to establish itself, supported by the French order Pères et religieuses des Sacrés-Cœurs de Picpus (founded in 1800). The missionaries spread from Mangareva to Tahuata, Ua Pou, Fatu Hiva and Nuku Hiva. They suffered the same hostile tribal reception as the previous Protestants. However, with the support of the French authorities, they were able to sustain themselves in the long run, despite the obstacles. They even managed to baptize King Moana of Nuku Hiva who, however, would die of smallpox in 1863.

The missionaries of all denominations did their best to eradicate the traditional culture in any way possible. Not only were the Christians disapproving of the long-enjoyed consumption of kava, the ancient and sacred tattoo artwork, and general dancing and traditional music, but they were especially horrified by tribal fertility/virility rites and skull dissection. However, they also tried and finally succeeded putting an end to cannibalism, human sacrifice and constant tribal warfare.

Language

French and Tahitian are the official languages of all of French Polynesia, but the Marquesan languages, in their various forms, remain the primary means of communication among residents within this archipelago, although knowledge of French is now almost universal among residents of the Marquesas Islands (see census data below).

Marquesan is a collection of East-Central Polynesian language dialects, of the Marquesic group, spoken in the Marquesas Islands of French Polynesia. They are usually classified into two groups, North Marquesan and South Marquesan, corresponding roughly along geographic lines.

The North Marquesan dialects are spoken on the islands of Ua Pu and Nuku Hiva, and South Marquesan dialects on the islands of Hiva Oa, Tahuata and Fatu Hiva. The dialects of Ua Huka are often incorrectly classified as North Marquesan; they are instead transitional. While the island is in the northern Marquesas group, the dialects show more morphological and phonological affinities with South Marquesan. The North Marquesan dialects are sometimes considered to be two separate languages: North Marquesan and Tai Pi Marquesan, the latter being spoken in the valleys of the eastern third of the island of Nuku Hiva, in the ancient province of Tai Pi.

Like other Polynesian languages, the phonology of Marquesan languages is characterised by a paucity of consonants and a comparative abundance of vowels.

Language data in 2017 census
At the 2017 census, 97.0% of the population whose age was 15 and older reported that they could speak French (up from 94.1% at the 2007 census). 92.6% reported that they could also read and write it (up from 90.2% at the 2007 census). Only 1.9% of the population whose age was 15 and older had no knowledge of French (down from 4.4% at the 2007 census).

At the same census, 66.9% of the population whose age was 15 and older reported that the language they spoke the most at home was Marquesan (down from 67.8% at the 2007 census). 30.2% reported that French was the language they spoke the most at home (up from 30.1% at the 2007 census). 2.3% reported Tahitian (up from 1.4% at the 2007 census), and 0.6% reported another language (down from 0.7% at the 2007 census).

4.9% of the population whose age was 15 and older reported that they had no knowledge of any Polynesian language at the 2017 census (down from 7.2% at the 2007 census).

Communications

Airports
There are four airports in the Marquesas, one each on the islands of Nuku Hiva, Ua Pou, Ua Huka, and Hiva Oa. The terrain of Tahuata is too irregular to allow for the construction of a landing strip without significant investment, and while the upland plateau of central Fatu Hiva is large enough to permit the construction of an airstrip, the island's minuscule population makes such an exercise of dubious benefit.

Telecommunications
The Marquesas are served by telephone as well as by radio and television, mainly from Tahiti. Recent additions include Vini, a mobile phone service that is a commercial subsidiary of the public , the sole provider of fixed telephony in most of Polynesia. Over a period of about six years, Vini has expanded to cover most of the populated islands.

Art and culture

The Marquesas Islands have a rich tradition of art. Art of the Marquesas ranges from large wooden sculptures of ancestors created for temples to small, intricate personal ornaments made from bone and shell. Carved wooden objects were decorated in elaborate anthropomorphic and geometric motifs, similar to tattoo designs that are part of a traditional practice.

Biology

The ecosystem of the Marquesas has been devastated in some areas by the activities of feral livestock. As a first step in preserving what remains, the Marquesan Nature Reserves were created in 1992.

In 1996 Lucien Kimitete, the Mayor of Nuku Hiva, proposed that the Marquesas become a UNESCO World Heritage Site. In May 2022 public consultations on their listing began. The French government formally lodged an application with UNESCO in January 2023.

See also

 Administrative divisions of France
 List of French islands in the Indian and Pacific oceans
 Overseas France
 Politics of French Polynesia
 Survivor: Marquesas

References

Further reading

Urmenyhazi, Attila. 2013 book publication: "Samoan & Marquesan Life in Oceania: a probing travelogue".  – National Library of Australia, Bib ID: 6377055

External links

 Stevenson, Robert L. (1896), In the South Seas
Official website Les îles Marquises en polynésie française
Administrative divisions of the Marquesas Islands (archived)
Effects of the 1946 Aleutian Tsunami on the Marquesas Is. (archived)
Flora of the Marquesas Islands
WorldAtlas.com's map of the Marquesas—includes most of the islands
Sailing Schedule to the Marquesas Islands (archived)

 
Hotspot volcanoes
Eastern Indo-Pacific
Marine ecoregions